The 2008 Sunshine Tour was the ninth season of professional golf tournaments since the southern Africa based Sunshine Tour was relaunched in 2000, and the second since the tour switched a calendar based season in 2007. The Sunshine Tour represents the highest level of competition for male professional golfers in the region.

The tour was based predominantly in South Africa, with 26 of the 30 tournaments being held in the country. Two events were held in Swaziland, with one each in Zambia and Namibia. There were two new tournaments, The Africa Open, which the tour hopes will become "Africa's Major" in the future, and the BMG Classic, founded by the Bearing Man Group, who wished to continue their involvement with the tour following the end of their long run as title sponsors of the Highveld Classic.

As usual, the tour consisted of two distinct parts, commonly referred to as the "Summer Swing" and "Winter Swing". Tournaments held during the Summer Swing generally had much higher prize funds, attracted stronger fields, and were the only tournaments on the tour to carry world ranking points, with three events being co-sanctioned with the European Tour. Since the tour switched to a calendar based season, this part of the tour has been split in two, with six events being held at the start of the year, and the remainder in December.

The Winter Swing ran from March to November, starting with the Mount Edgecombe Trophy, and closing with the Coca-Cola Charity Championship, hosted by Gary Player.

The order of merit was dominated by Richard Sterne, who won all three European Tour co-sanctioned tournaments, by far the richest on the tour.

Schedule
The following table lists official events during the 2008 season.

Order of Merit
The Order of Merit was based on prize money won during the season, calculated in South African rand.

Robert Rock was the third highest money winner (with R1,280,632.80) but did not qualify for the Order of Merit, having only played in two events.

Notes

References

External links

Sunshine Tour
Sunshine Tour